The 75th Ranger Regiment has been awarded numerous honors and decorations from its campaigns, beginning in World War II. In World War II, they participated in 16 major campaigns, spearheading the campaigns in Morocco, Sicily, Naples-Foggia, Anzio and Leyte. During the Vietnam War, they received campaign participation streamers for every campaign in the war.

The regiment received streamers with arrowheads (denoting conflicts they spearheaded) for its participation in the invasions of Grenada and Panama.

To date, the Rangers have earned six Presidential Unit Citations, nine Valorous Unit Awards, and four Meritorious Unit Commendation, the most recent of which were earned in Vietnam and Haditha, Iraq, respectively.

Campaign Participation Credit

 World War II:

  Algeria-French Morocco (with )
  Tunisia
  Sicily (with )
  Naples-Foggia (with )
  Anzio (with )
  Rome-Arno
  Normandy (with )
  Northern France
  Rhineland
  Ardennes-Alsace
  Central Europe
  New Guinea
  Philippines
  Leyte (with )
  Luzon
  India-Burma
  Central Burma
 Vietnam:
  Advisory
  Defense
  Counteroffensive
  Counteroffensive, Phase II
  Counteroffensive, Phase III
  Counteroffensive, Phase IV
  Counteroffensive, Phase V
  Counteroffensive, Phase VI
  Counteroffensive, Phase VII
  Tet Counteroffensive
  Tet 69/Counteroffensive
  Summer-Fall 1969
  Winter-Spring 1970
  Sanctuary Counteroffensive
  Consolidation I
  Consolidation II
  Cease-Fire
 Armed Forces Expeditions:
  Grenada (with )
  Panama (with )
 Global War on Terrorism
 
 Afghanistan
  Liberation of Afghanistan
  Consolidation I
  Consolidation II
 Iraqi
  Liberation of Iraq
  Transition of Iraq
  Iraqi Governance
  National Resolution

Decorations
  Presidential Unit Citation (Army) for El Guetar
  Presidential Unit Citation (Army) for Salerno
  Presidential Unit Citation (Army) for Pointe du Hoc
  Presidential Unit Citation (Army) for Saar River Area
  Presidential Unit Citation (Army) for Myitkyina
  Presidential Unit Citation (Army) for Vietnam 1966-1968
  Presidential Unit Citation (Army) for Afghanistan 2010
  Joint Meritorious Unit Citation for Panama 1989
  Joint Meritorious Unit Citation for Afghanistan 04 Oct 2001- 31 Dec 2004
  Valorous Unit Award for Vietnam - II Corps Area
  Valorous Unit Award for Bình Dương Province
  Valorous Unit Award for III Corps Area 1969
  Valorous Unit Award for Fish Hook
  Valorous Unit Award for III Corps Area 1971
  Valorous Unit Award for Thừa Thiên–Quảng Trị
  Valorous Unit Award for Grenada
  Valorous Unit Award for Mogadishu
  Valorous Unit Award for Haditha, Iraq
  Valorous Unit Award for Southern Afghanistan 2011
  Meritorious Unit Commendation (Army) for Vietnam 1968
  Meritorious Unit Commendation (Army) for Vietnam 1969
  Meritorious Unit Commendation (Army) for Vietnam 1969-1970
  Meritorious Unit Commendation (Army) for Pacific Area
  Meritorious Unit Commendation (Army) for Afghanistan 2011

See also
75th Ranger Regiment
United States Army Rangers

References

External links

 USASOC (2003). 75th Ranger Regiment: Fact Sheet. U.S. Special Operations Command. United States of America.

Awards and decorations of the United States Army
United States Army Rangers regiments